Chagunius baileyi is a species of freshwater fish of the genus Chagunius found in Myanmar and Thailand in the Salween and Sittaung rivers.

References

External links 

Cyprinid fish of Asia
Fish of Thailand
Fish described in 1986